Veppanatham is a village located in Salem district, Tamil Nadu, India.The Ponnolinagar village is also comes under Veppanatham Panchayath.

Located in 

It is located 77 km towards East from District headquarters Salem. 10 km from Thalaivasal and 25 km from Attur and also 16 km from Chinnasalem.

Pin Code and STD Code 

Postal Services are given to this Village by the Varagoor post office which is located around 2 Kilometer from here.

Pin Code : 636112 . STD Code : 04282.

How to reach 

You can get buses from Attur or Thalaivasal bus stand. Bus numbers : 12, 34, Ravikumar . Also, Mini bus facility is available from Thalaivasal.

Bus Stop Name: Veppanatham.

Nearby Railway station

Melnariyapanur Railway Station, Talaivasal Railway Station are the very nearby railway stations to Veppanatham.

School 
Veppanantham has panchayat union middle school near the bus stop.

Also, two privates schools are available namely Bharathi Vidhyalaya Matriculation Higher Secondary School and Classic Matriculation Higher Secondary School.

One Govt. High School at a nearby town called Siruvachur, A Govt.Middle school at Veppanatham and a Govt.Kinder school at Ponnolinagar Village which comes under Veppanatham Panchayat.

Temples 
In this village has two oldest temples Panchaliamman, Vinayagar and Perumal, these temples are nearly 150 years old.

Villages in Salem district